Federated Mutual Insurance Company ("Federated") is a direct writer of property and casualty insurance products headquartered in Owatonna, Minnesota. The Company has approximately 2,600 employees and operates in 47 states, with several service offices located throughout the country. Federated has an A.M. Best rating of "A+ (Superior)."

History

During the 1890s, the retail implement dealers in Minnesota formed an association, which proved to be very successful. In 1904, these dealers decided to try to reduce their insurance costs by organizing their own insurance company.

Initially, the company was known as the Minnesota Implement Mutual Fire Insurance Company, and retained this name for many years. They would later become the Mutual Implement and Hardware Insurance Company, then Federated Mutual Implement and Hardware Insurance Company and, finally, Federated Mutual Insurance Company ("Federated Mutual").

On January 1, 1948, Federated Mutual entered the casualty insurance field, and was one of the first major insurance companies to write both fire and casualty insurance. In November 1949, accident and health coverage was added, with group accident and health insurance being written for various trade associations and employer groups. Federated Life Insurance Company (or "Federated Life") was organized in January 1959.

Products and Services

List of products and services offered by Federated Mutual Insurance Company:
 Commercial property and casualty insurance 
 Life and disability insurance
Risk management and loss prevention resources
Workers compensation insurance
Bonding
Estate planning and financial services

Federated Mutual once offered group health insurance, but ceased this offering at the end of 2017.

Industries
List of industries Federated Mutual Insurance Company insures:

 Auto dealers and auto parts wholesalers
 Contractors (building materials, hardware, electrical, plumbing-heating-cooling, specialized)
 Equipment dealers (agricultural, lawn and garden, construction)
 Funeral services
 Jewelry retailers
 Machining, plastics, and tooling shops
 Petroleum marketers and convenience stores
 Printers
 Tire dealers
 Custom cabinet and woodworkers

Philanthropy

Federated Challenge 
Federated Mutual Insurance Company hosts an annual two-day fundraising event in St. Paul, Minnesota, for Big Brothers Big Sisters organizations. The event, in its 18th year, has raised over $47 million to support mentoring programs.

Gala 
The gala, held on the first night of the Challenge, features live entertainment, a silent auction and a live auction.

Golf Event 
The golf event, held on the second day of the Challenge at Interlachen Country Club in Edina, Minnesota, features a four-person scramble and various smaller contests.

Canadian History

Federated Mutual is not associated with Federated Insurance Company of Canada

References

External links 
 Federated Insurance Company

Companies based in Owatonna, Minnesota
Financial services companies established in 1904
Insurance companies of the United States
Mutual insurance companies of the United States
Privately held companies based in Minnesota
1904 establishments in Minnesota
American companies established in 1904